Anula may refer to:

 Anula, Northern Territory, a suburb of Darwin, Australia
 Anula of Anuradhapura, ancient Sri Lankan queen
 Anula Vidyalaya, a Buddhist school in Sri Lanka
 Anul, a village in India; also known as Anula